Unnaipol Oruvan (also released internationally under the translated title Someone Like You) is a 2009 Indian Tamil-language thriller film directed by Chakri Toleti in his directorial debut. It stars Kamal Haasan and Mohanlal. The film was simultaneously made in Telugu as Eenadu with Venkatesh playing Mohanlal's role, both remakes of the 2008 Hindi film A Wednesday!. Set in Chennai and Hyderabad in the Tamil and Telugu versions respectively, the film depicts the confrontation between an anonymous caller who has planted bombs in the city and wants four terrorists to be released, and a police commissioner who tries to hunt him down.

Released on 18 September 2009, both Unnaipol Oruvan and Eenadu received positive reviews from the critics and were commercially successful. The Tamil version film was dubbed and released in Malayalam as Oru Budhanazhcha, which translates to A Wednesday akin to the title of the film it is based on.

Plot 
Raghavan Maarar (Eashwar Prasad in Telugu version), the recently dismissed DGP of Chennai (Hyderabad in Telugu version), describes in a voice-over about his sudden termination by police, due to a common man who walked into his life. An unnamed man is shown strategically placing a travel bag on a train at the Chennai Central railway station and in a shopping mall. He then proceeds to place another bag, under the pretence of lodging an FIR, in the toilet of a police station in Anna Salai, Chennai (Lakdi-ka-pool, Hyderabad in Telugu version), and then arrives on the rooftop of an under-construction building and sets up his base of operations, equipped with gadgets and instruments. 

The caller calls up Maraar and informs him that five bombs have been planted in locations throughout Chennai, which are programmed to explode simultaneously within 4 hours. The caller demands that he would like to negotiate with a senior government official, who has the full authority. Maraar seeks the services of the chief secretary to act as the negotiator. Maraar also alerts his team involved in intelligence research and surveillance, tapping all the available resources in gathering preliminary information and tracing the location of the caller, who later tips off news reporter Natasha Rajkumar, telling her to reach Anna Salai police station immediately. Maraar initially suspects the caller to be bluffing, but his doubts are dispelled as the caller, to prove his seriousness and the police force's helplessness, reveals that a bomb has been planted in the Anna Salai police station. 

When the bomb disposal squad find the bomb, there is only three minutes left. They manage to deactivate the bomb after following the caller's instructions. Natasha reaches the scene on the caller's instructions and reports about the situation. An intense debate ensues between Maraar and the chief secretary on who would act as the negotiator with the caller. The chief secretary appoints Maraar as the State's negotiator with unrestricted power for one day. The caller talks full of life logics and religious philosophy and finally asks Maarar to release three terrorists and one convicted arms seller, all who were arrested by him years ago. Maraar's men realise that the caller is using advanced software to automatically switch the numbers and locations of his mobile phone SIM card every minute, rendering their manpower and the obsolete equipment useless and prompting them to employ the services of a young hacker, an IIT drop-out. 

In the meantime, Maraar is able to obtain a facial composite of the caller with help of the police officer to whom the caller had approached to lodge the fake FIR, but much of the time passes without any concrete results on the identity or the location of the caller. Ultimately, Maraar agrees with the caller's demand and puts two of his best men, Arif Khan and Sethuraman (Gautham Reddy in Telugu version), in charge of handing over the four terrorists at the Sholavaram airstrip. Once there, the caller confirms the identity of the four men via a conference call with Arif and Maraar. He then asks Arif and Sethu to unlock their handcuffs and leave them alone at a particular spot. Sethu orders his men to do as told but, at the last moment, Arif decides not to hand over terrorist Abdullah, to ensure all the information regarding the locations of the bombs can be forced out from the caller. 

Sethu argues with Arif and demands he do as ordered, but Arif forcefully grabs Abdullah and starts walking away. The other three enter a car which explodes soon after, killing them, but the caller knows that Abdullah is alive, and threatens to blow up the remaining bombs across the city unless Arif and Sethu kill Abdullah. The Chief Secretary tells Maraar that the CM has to know about the current situation but Maraar disagrees and tells her that he will face the consequences, and orders Arif to kill the terrorist. Arif kills Abdullah and Sethu shoots Arif in the hand to make it look like an attack for self-defense. The caller confirms it via the news and reveals that he was bluffing and there are no more bombs anywhere in Chennai. He tells that as terrorism is instant, justice and safety must be so. Then Maarar questions the IIT hacker to trace the caller, but he refuses.

Maraar looks in the hacker's computer, discovers the location, and leaves abruptly towards the site. The caller, meanwhile destroys all of his gadgets with a mini-bomb inside a drum. As he leaves his hideout with all his camouflage, Maarar catches up to him. Both shake hands; in a voiceover, Maraar says the caller told him his real name, but does not reveal it as it does not have any significance. He adds that the higher most officials saved themselves by framing him as a recluse and the CM fired him. Maraar admits that they all knew the caller was disturbed because of the insecure environment and the incompetence of the governing authorities but he never imagined him to go to such lengths and have the guts to do something like that. He also repeats that the facts of this incident cannot be found in any written records but only in the memories of those who actually witnessed it. Maarar acknowledges that although the incident has ambiguous moral significance, he personally feels that whatever happened, happened for the best.

Cast

Production

Casting 
While Kamal Haasan was cast in the lead role; confirmation of Mohanlal's presence in the film followed. The film was announced as a bilingual film with Venkatesh reprising Mohanlal's role in the Telugu version. Ganesh Venkatraman, who debuted in the 2008 film Abhiyum Naanum, was later confirmed for a supporting role. Bharath Reddy, who played a cop in the Telugu film Siddam, is playing another supporting cop role.

UTV Motion Pictures distributed the film along with Raaj Kamal Films International, Haasan's home production company, which produced it. Unnaipol Oruvan was directed by Chakri, a US-based filmmaker and a close friend of Haasan. Chakri had previously played the role of Govind's friend, Sai Ram, in Dasavathaaram, and the role of a child who takes still photographs of Kamal in the 1983 Telugu film Saagara Sangamam. Neeraj Pandey wrote the film's dialogue and screenplay. The music was composed by Kamal Haasan's daughter, Shruthi Haasan.

The title was changed from Thalaivan Irukkiran to Unnaipol Oruvan in early April 2009, named after a novel by Jayakanthan.

Filming 
Unnaipol Oruvan started its first filming schedule on 6 February 2009. It completed shooting in 65 days.

Themes 
According to Kamal, Unnaipol Oruvan portrays the "common man's anger, angst and suffering". Describing the film as an action drama and a thriller, the British Board of Film Classification gave the Tamil version a 15 rating, and noted the film had a vigilante theme, as a character placed lives under threat and murdered convicts because of a lack of faith in the justice system.

Soundtrack 

The music was composed by Shruti Haasan, daughter of Kamal Haasan. The album contains four songs and a remix. The songs are featured throughout the film. Kamal Haasan, singer Blaaze, and Manyusha Puthran contributed the lyrics. The audio launch was held on 6 September 2009 at Sathyam Cinemas.

 Tamil Track List

 Telugu Track List

Release 
Unnaipol Oruvan was initially set to release on 12 August 2009, since the date coincided with the release of Kamal Haasan's first film Kalathur Kannamma. However, owing to technical and administrative difficulties, the release was postponed to 18 September. The film was given a U/A (Parental Guidance) rating from the Central Board of Film Certification, mainly because of its theme – terrorism. In 2015, Telugu version Eeenadu was screened at the Habitat Film Festival.

Home media
Unnaipol Oruvan was released on Blu-ray on 12 February 2010. Eenadu was released on Blu-ray on 23 February 2010.

Eenadu is available to stream via ZEE5.

Critical reception

Unnaipol Oruvan 
Writing for The Hollywood Reporter , Gautaman Bhaskaran wrote that Unnaipol Oruvan is "far more engaging and energetic than its predecessor" and that "superstar Mohanlal plays Chennai police commissioner Raghavan Maraar with rare finesse and extraordinary subtlety ... His screen presence is so overwhelming that an equally great Tamil superstar, Kamal Haasan, as the nameless Common Man, is overshadowed". Sify said that technically the film is picture-perfect and that both Kamal Haasan and Mohanlal coming together is worth the ticket money. It mentioned that unlike in the Hindi version where Naseeruddin Shah had an edge over Anupam Kher, here the best dialogues were almost equally given to Mohanlal as well, "what elevates the film to a new high is the crisp presentation and outstanding performances from the lead actors, mainly Kamal and Mohanlal, who simply rock".

Behindwoods rated that overall it was a brilliant work which will be appreciated by every socially responsible citizen of India. The Times of India gave the film 3.5 out of 5 stars and stated that "Debutant director Chakri Toleti's job is a cakewalk. Having chosen a proven subject, and a formidable star cast which does not have to be told anything beyond the shooting schedule, the captain's hat sits on his head easily".

Eenadu 
Regarding the Telugu version, Rediff.com stated that "For the Telugu audience, Eenadu is a film which is out of the formulaic pattern and the hero warp Telugu cinema is in, and shows that films like it can be made too which can be seen and enjoyed with the audience taking home something extra too!" The Times of India gave the film 3 out of 5 stars and stated that "The much-awaited Eenadu lives up to the big expectations and carries the essence of the original (A Wednesday)".

Awards and nominations

Ananda Vikatan Cinema Awards 
Mohanlal – Best Supporting Actor

57th Filmfare Awards South
Nominated
 Filmfare Award for Best Actor – Telugu – Kamal Haasan
 Filmfare Award for Best Supporting Actor – Telugu – Venkatesh
 Filmfare Award for Best Supporting Actress – Telugu – Lakshmi

References

External links 
 
 

2009 films
2009 thriller films
Indian thriller films
Films about terrorism in India
Films set in Chennai
Films set in Hyderabad, India
Films about organised crime in India
Tamil remakes of Hindi films
Telugu remakes of Hindi films
Fictional portrayals of the Tamil Nadu Police
Fictional portrayals of the Andhra Pradesh Police
2000s Tamil-language films
2000s Telugu-language films
Indian multilingual films
UTV Motion Pictures films
2009 directorial debut films
Indian vigilante films
2009 multilingual films
Films directed by Chakri Toleti
2000s vigilante films